Private Passion is the fourth album by Jeff Lorber, released in 1986 on Warner Bros. Records. It features Karyn White and Tower of Power member Michael Jeffries on vocals.

The album peaked at No. 68 on the Billboard 200, becoming Lorber's most successful album. "Facts of Love" peaked at No. 27 on the Billboard Hot 100, becoming the album's (and Lorber's) only Top 40 hit.

Aftermath
Despite the success of Private Passion, Jeff Lorber was not satisfied with the output of his solo albums, stating that they have a more vocal and R&B approach with himself as a sideman. As a result, he took a hiatus in music before returning in 1993 with Worth Waiting For. Meanwhile, the album launched Karyn White's solo career as she released her 1988 debut self-titled album, which contained 3 Top 10 singles.

Track listing

Personnel 
 Jeff Lorber – synthesizers (1, 2, 9), programming (1, 2), synthesizer programming (3-9), guitars (3)
 Carl Sturken – synthesizers (1, 2), programming (1, 2), synthesizer programming (6), guitars (6)
 Robbie Buchanan – synthesizer programming (4)
 Larry Carlton – guitars (3)
 Dann Huff – guitars (4)
 Buzz Feiten – guitars (5, 7, 8, 9)
 Brock Walsh – drum programming (9)
 Freddie Hubbard – flugelhorn (5)
 George Howard – soprano saxophone (7)
 Karyn White – lead vocals (1, 2, 4), backing vocals (1, 2)
 Michael Jeffries – lead vocals (4, 6, 8), backing vocals (6)
 Evan Rogers – backing vocals (1, 2, 4, 6, 8)
 Bunny Hull – backing vocals (4, 8)

Production 
 Jeff Lorber – producer (1, 2, 3, 5-9), recording (1, 2, 6, 8, 9)
 Evan Rogers – producer (1, 2, 6)
 Carl Sturken – producer (1, 2, 6)
 Taavi Mote – associate producer (1, 2, 6), mixing (1, 2, 3, 5-9), producer (3, 5, 7), recording (3, 7, 8, 9)
 Robbie Buchanan – producer (4)
 Brock Walsh – producer (8)
 Paul Retaczak – overdub tracking (1, 2, 6), recording (8)
 Craig Burbage – guitar recording (3)
 Paul Ericksen – engineer (4)
 Frank Wolf – engineer (4)
 John "Tokes" Potoker – mixing (4)
 Sabrina Buchanek – assistant engineer (9)
 Darwin Foye – assistant engineer (9)
 John Hegedes – assistant engineer (9)
 Jimmy Hogson – assistant engineer (9)
 Glen Holguin – assistant engineer (9)
 Jeff Lorenzen – assistant engineer (9)
 Bernie Grundman – mastering 
 Laura LiPuma – art direction, design 
 Nels Israelson – photography 
 Steve Drimmer – manager 
 Allen Kovac – manager
 Left Bank Management – management company

Studios
 Mixed at The Village Recorder and Studio 55 (Los Angeles, CA).
 Mastered at Bernie Grundman Mastering (Hollywood, CA).

Charts
Album

Singles

References

External links

1986 albums
Albums produced by Carl Sturken and Evan Rogers
Collaborative albums
Jeff Lorber albums
Warner Records albums